Robert Yehoshua Büchler (1929–2009) was a Slovak-Israeli historian. In 1944, he was deported from Slovakia and survived Auschwitz and Buchenwald concentration camps. Büchler was awarded the Order of Merit of the Free State of Thuringia.

Works

References

Slovak Jews
Israeli Jews
Auschwitz concentration camp survivors
Buchenwald concentration camp survivors
Czechoslovak historians
20th-century Israeli historians
Slovak emigrants to Israel
1929 births
2009 deaths
People from Topoľčany